Makers of Men is a 1925 American silent war drama film directed by Forrest Sheldon and starring Kenneth MacDonald, Clara Horton and J.P. McGowan.

Synopsis
The easily disturbed Jimmy Jones suffers from a nervous disorder that provokes mockery about his cowardice from the fellow inhabitants of his small town even Lillian the woman he is in love with. When the First World War breaks out he volunteers for the Army. After serving in France along with an utterly fearless Sergeant, he returns home completely cured.

Cast
 Kenneth MacDonald as Jimmy Jones
 Clara Horton as 	Lillian Gilman
 J.P. McGowan as Sgt. Banks
 W.H. Burton as Hiram Renfrew
 William Lowery as Steppling
 Ethan Laidlaw as Shiftless Poole

References

Bibliography
 Connelly, Robert B. The Silents: Silent Feature Films, 1910-36, Volume 40, Issue 2. December Press, 1998.
 Munden, Kenneth White. The American Film Institute Catalog of Motion Pictures Produced in the United States, Part 1. University of California Press, 1997.

External links
 

1925 films
1925 war films
1920s English-language films
American silent feature films
American war films
Films directed by Forrest Sheldon
American black-and-white films
American World War I films
Films set in France
1920s American films